The Billings Outlaws are a professional indoor football team set to begin play as a member of Champions Indoor Football for the 2022 season.  Based in Billings, Montana, the Outlaws play their home games at MetraPark First Interstate Arena.

History
The Outlaws will be the third indoor football team to be based in Billings following the original Billings Outlaws (2000–2010) and the Billings Wolves (2015–2016).

On April 30, 2021, Keith Russ and Tel Koen, owners of fellow Champions Indoor Football (CIF) team the Wyoming Mustangs, announced they would bring an expansion CIF team to Billings for the 2022 season.  A name-the-team contest was held, with the Outlaws being named the winner on July 22.  Despite using the original Outlaws' name, logo, and colors, the current Outlaws are considered to be a new franchise, with no other connection to the previous Outlaws.

In June 2022 it was announced Steven Titus, a Gillette, Wyoming attorney purchased the team from Russ.

Season-by-season results

Notes

External links
 Official website

Champions Indoor Football teams
American football teams in Montana
Sports in Billings, Montana
American football teams established in 2021
2021 establishments in Montana